Fortune Lane is a 1947 British family drama film directed by John Baxter and starring Douglas Barr, Billy Thatcher and Brian Weske.

Plot
A boy tries to raise money so he can train to be an engineer, but ends up giving the money to a friend so he can visit an ill relative.

Cast
 Douglas Barr - Peter Quentin
 Billy Thatcher - John
 Brian Weske - Tim
 Angela Glynne - Margaret Quentin
 George Carney - Mr Quentin
 Nell Ballantyne - Mrs Quentin
 Anthony Holles - Mr Carpenter

Critical reception
TV Guide wrote "Pleasant children's film is a cut above the usually awful run," and rated it two out of five stars.

References

External links

1947 films
1947 drama films
1940s English-language films
Films directed by John Baxter
British drama films
British black-and-white films
1940s British films